Kapanen is a Finnish surname. Notable people with the surname include:

 Kasperi Kapanen (born 1996), Finnish professional ice hockey forward
 Kimmo Kapanen (born 1974), Finnish professional ice hockey goaltender
 Niko Kapanen (born 1978), Finnish professional ice hockey center
 Oliver Kapanen (born 2003), Finnish professional ice hockey center
 Sami Kapanen (born 1973), Finnish professional ice hockey forward

Finnish-language surnames